The 1984 Southwestern Louisiana Ragin' Cajuns football team was an American football team that represented the University of Southwestern Louisiana (now known as the University of Louisiana at Lafayette) as an independent during the 1984 NCAA Division I-A football season. In their fifth year under head coach Sam Robertson, the team compiled a 6–5 record.

Schedule

References

Southwestern Louisiana
Louisiana Ragin' Cajuns football seasons
Southwestern Louisiana Ragin' Cajuns football